Stéphane Patry is a Swiss professional ice hockey left winger who is currently playing with HC Lugano of the National League (NL).

Playing career
Patry started playing hockey with CP Meyrin different junior teams, before joining Genève-Servette HC U15 team in 2011. Patry played one season of junior hockey with the Erie Otters of the Ontario Hockey League (OHL), appearing in 50 games and tallying 14 points during the 2017–18 season.

He returned to Geneva for the 2018–19 season to play with Genève-Servette HC U20 team and eventually won the Junior Elite A title with the team. During that same season, Patry also made his NL debut with Genève-Servette HC, playing in 6 regular season games (1 assist).

Patry spent the majority of the 2019–20 season with Genève-Servette HC, playing in 21 games and scoring 7 points (3 goals). He also had a brief stint with HC Sierre of the Swiss League (SL), appearing in 10 games and tallying 2 assists.

International play
Patry was named to Switzerland men's national junior team for the 2020 World Junior Championships.

References

External links

2000 births
Living people
Genève-Servette HC players
Ice hockey people from Geneva
HC La Chaux-de-Fonds players
HC Lugano players
HC Sierre players
Swiss ice hockey left wingers
HCB Ticino Rockets players